Rule 3: Conceal Your Intentions E.P. is the debut EP by English alternative rock band Septembre. It was released on April 12, 2004 on Sugar Shack Records.

The EP peaked at #159 on the UK Album Charts.

Track listing
"I Am Weightless" – 2:29
"Always" – 4:54
"Happy" – 4:26
"(Face)" – 5:46

Trivia
 "I Am Weightless" was featured on the soundtrack for the game Need for Speed Underground 2 and in the unreleased beta of Need for Speed Carbon.

References 

Septembre albums
2004 EPs